Thomas Sinton Hewitt (31 July 1887 – 1976) was an Australian long-distance runner.

Athlete
He was the (pre-war) captain of the Malvern Harriers Athletic Club (and also, from this, a club-mate of Percy Cerutty), and a well-performed long distance runner. He represented Australia, running under the name of "Sinton Hewitt", in both the marathon (finishing 30th, in 3h 3m 27s) and the 10,000 metres (finishing tenth in his heat, time unknown) at the 1920 Olympic Games in Antwerp, Belgium.

Boundary umpire
He was a boundary umpire at the "Pioneer Exhibition Game" of Australian Rules football in London (1916). A news film was taken at the match.

See also
 1916 Pioneer Exhibition Game

Footnotes

References
 Pioneer Exhibition Game Australian Football: in aid of British and French Red Cross Societies: 3rd Australian Division v. Australian Training Units at Queen's Club, West Kensington, on Saturday, October 28th, 1916, at 3pm, Wightman & Co., (London), 1919.
 Second from left, in middle row, in the photograph at AIF athletics team (D00674), collection of the Australian War Memorial.
 First World War Embarkation Roll: Sergeant Thomas Sinton Hewitt (129), collection of the Australian War Memorial.
 First World War Nominal Roll: Sergeant Thomas Sinton Hewitt (129), collection of the Australian War Memorial.
 First World War Service Record: Sergeant Thomas Sinton Hewitt (129), National Archives of Australia. 
 Main, J. & Allen, D., Fallen — The Ultimate Heroes: Footballers Who Never Returned From War, Crown Content, (Melbourne), 2002. 
 Richardson, N. (2016), The Game of Their Lives, Pan Macmillan Australia: Sydney.

External links
 

1887 births
1976 deaths
Participants in "Pioneer Exhibition Game" (London, 28 October 1916)
Athletes (track and field) at the 1920 Summer Olympics
Australian male long-distance runners
Australian male marathon runners
Olympic athletes of Australia
Athletes from Melbourne
Australian rules football umpires
People from St Kilda, Victoria